CED-5 is an ortholog of the mammalian protein Dock180，which present in the nematode worm C. elegans., the Drosophila melanogaster ortholog of CED-5 is Myoblast city.

Reference 

Caenorhabditis elegans genes